Weekend with Kate is a 1990 Australian film directed by Arch Nicholson and starring Colin Friels and Catherine McClements.

References

External links

Weekend with Kate at Oz Movies

1990 films
Australian comedy films
1990s English-language films
Films directed by Arch Nicholson
1990s Australian films